is a former Japanese football player and manager. He played for Japan national team.

Club career
Ueki was born in Kawasaki on September 13, 1954. After graduating from Nihon University, he joined Fujita Industries in 1977. The club won the league champions in 1977, 1979 and 1981. The club also won 1977 and 1979 Emperor's Cup. He retired in 1988. He played 144 games and scored 16 goals in the league.

National team career
On July 13, 1979, Ueki debuted for Japan national team against Singapore and Japan won the match.

Coaching career
After retirement, Ueki started coaching career at Fujita Industries (later Bellmare Hiratsuka). In November 1995, he became a manager as Mitsuru Komaeda successor and managed at 1995 Emperor's Cup and 1995 Asian Cup Winners' Cup. The club won the champions at Asian Cup Winners' Cup. In September 1996, he became a manager again as Toninho Moura successor and managed until 1998. In 1999, he moved to J2 League club Montedio Yamagata and managed until 2000. In 2002, he moved to Japan Football League club Thespa Kusatsu. In 2004, he managed 1 season and promoted the club to J2 League. In 2006, he became a manager again and managed until 2008.

National team statistics

Managerial statistics

References

External links

Japan National Football Team Database

1954 births
Living people
Nihon University alumni
Association football people from Kanagawa Prefecture
Japanese footballers
Japan international footballers
Shonan Bellmare players
Japanese football managers
J1 League managers
J2 League managers
Shonan Bellmare managers
Montedio Yamagata managers
Thespakusatsu Gunma managers
Association football forwards
Association football midfielders